The 1990 Saarland state election was held on 28 January 1990 to elect the members of the Landtag of Saarland. The incumbent Social Democratic Party (SPD) government led by Minister-President Oskar Lafontaine was returned with an increased majority and continued in office.

Parties
The table below lists parties represented in the previous Landtag of Saarland.

Election result

|-
! colspan="2" | Party
! Votes
! %
! +/-
! Seats 
! +/-
! Seats %
|-
| bgcolor=| 
| align=left | Social Democratic Party (SPD)
| align=right| 377,502
| align=right| 54.4
| align=right| 5.2
| align=right| 30
| align=right| 4
| align=right| 58.8
|-
| bgcolor=| 
| align=left | Christian Democratic Union (CDU)
| align=right| 231,983
| align=right| 33.4
| align=right| 3.9
| align=right| 18
| align=right| 2
| align=right| 35.3
|-
| bgcolor=| 
| align=left | Free Democratic Party (FDP)
| align=right| 39,113
| align=right| 5.6
| align=right| 4.4
| align=right| 3
| align=right| 2
| align=right| 5.9
|-
! colspan=8|
|-
| bgcolor=| 
| align=left | The Republicans (REP)
| align=right| 23,263
| align=right| 3.4
| align=right| 3.4
| align=right| 0
| align=right| ±0
| align=right| 0
|-
| bgcolor=| 
| align=left | Alliance 90/The Greens (Grüne)
| align=right| 18,380
| align=right| 2.6
| align=right| 0.1
| align=right| 0
| align=right| ±0
| align=right| 0
|-
| bgcolor=|
| align=left | Others
| align=right| 3,860
| align=right| 0.6
| align=right| 
| align=right| 0
| align=right| ±0
| align=right| 0
|-
! align=right colspan=2| Total
! align=right| 694,101
! align=right| 100.0
! align=right| 
! align=right| 51
! align=right| ±0
! align=right| 
|-
! align=right colspan=2| Voter turnout
! align=right| 
! align=right| 83.2
! align=right| 1.8
! align=right| 
! align=right| 
! align=right| 
|}

Sources
 Landtagswahlen im Saarland seit 1945

1990
Saarland
January 1990 events in Europe